Eurylabus is a genus of ichneumon wasps in the family Ichneumonidae. There are about 11 described species in Eurylabus.

Species
These 11 species belong to the genus Eurylabus:
 Eurylabus charlottae Heinrich, 1974
 Eurylabus dholadharensis Gupta, 1955
 Eurylabus indolarvatus Heinrich, 1974
 Eurylabus kiashii Uchida, 1956
 Eurylabus larvatus (Christ, 1791)  (Europe)
 Eurylabus malaisei Heinrich, 1974
 Eurylabus nakayai Uchida, 1956
 Eurylabus quadratus Uchida, 1926
 Eurylabus torvus Wesmael, 1845  (Europe)
 Eurylabus tristis (Gravenhorst, 1829)  (Europe)
 Eurylabus victoriae Heinrich, 1974  (temperate Asia)

References

Ichneumoninae